Rod Frawley and Geoff Masters were the defending champions but only Frawley competed that year with Chris Lewis.

Frawley and Lewis lost in the second round to Peter Fleming and John McEnroe.

Pat DuPré and Brian Teacher won the doubles title at the 1981 Queen's Club Championships tennis tournament defeating Kevin Curren and Steve Denton in the final 3–6, 7–6, 11–9.

Seeds

Draw

Final

Top half

Bottom half

References

External links
Official website Queen's Club Championships 
ATP tournament profile

Doubles